Keith Hall served as the Director of the U.S. Congressional Budget Office from 2015 to 2019. He was the Commissioner of the U.S. Bureau of Labor Statistics from January 2008 until January 2012. He previously worked at the Department of Commerce, Department of Treasury, the U.S. International Trade Commission, and the White House Council of Economic Advisers.

Career
Hall was nominated by President George W. Bush to the position of Commissioner of the BLS in September 2007 and confirmed by the Senate in December. He was sworn into office in January 2008 and served a four-year term ending in 2012.  Previously, he was Chief Economist for the White House Council of Economic Advisers. He also held the positions of Chief Economist for the Department of Commerce and Senior International Economist for the International Trade Commission's Research Division. He has also served on the faculties of the University of Arkansas and University of Missouri.

On April 1, 2011, Hall testified on Capitol Hill to the United States Congress Joint Economic Committee that the nation's unemployment rate had fallen to 8.8 percent, a two-year low. Statistics released by the BLS showed that non-farm payroll employment rose by 1.5 million from February 2010 and private sector employment increased by 1.8 million during the same period.

Hall was the ninth Director of the Congressional Budget Office from April 1, 2015 to May 31, 2019.

Education
Hall received his B.A. from the University of Virginia and his Ph.D. from Purdue University.

References

External links
 Politico profile

American civil servants
Bureau of Labor Statistics
Directors of the Congressional Budget Office
Living people
Purdue University alumni
University of Virginia alumni
Year of birth missing (living people)
George W. Bush administration personnel
Obama administration personnel